is a town located in Rumoi Subprefecture, Hokkaido, Japan.

As of September 2016, the town has an estimated population of 7,338. The total area is 472.49 km2. The town also administers the two islands of Yagishiri and Teuri.

Haboro was officially designated a town in 1921. The villages of Teuri and Yagishiri were merged into Haboro in 1955 and 1959, respectively.

Etymology
The name of the town is from the Ainu language, but of uncertain origin. Haboro may have originated with the Ainu language word hapuru, meaning "a soft sound", or haporopetsu, meaning "the basin of a large river".

In Japanese, the name of the town is written with ateji, or kanji characters used to phonetically represent native or borrowed words. The first, means "feather" or "wings", and the second, means "curtain" or "cloth".

Geography
Haboro faces the Sea of Japan. Much of the area of the town is within the Teshio Mountains, and much of the town is protected as a national forest. Two rivers cross the town: the Haboro and the Chikubetsu.

Islands
The municipality of Haboro includes two sparsely populated islands in the Sea of Japan.
Yagishiri Island, population 273, is located northwest of Haboro Bay, and is known for its dense forests.

Neighboring municipalities
 Rumoi Subprefecture
 Tomamae District：Tomamae, Shosanbetsu
 Teshio District：Enbetsu
 Kamikawa Subprefecture
 Uryū District：Horokanai

Climate
Haboro has a humid continental climate (Köppen climate classification Dfb) with warm summers and cold winters. Precipitation is high throughout the year; the months from August to December are wetter than the rest of the year.

Transportation

Rail
Haboro was originally connected to other areas of Hokkaido by rail. The Japanese National Railways  extended 141.1 km between Rumoi and Horonobe. Construction on the line dated to 1927, but it was discontinued in 1987 with the establishment of JR Hokkaido during the privatization of Japanese National Railways.

Highway
Haboro is crossed by National Route 232, a national highway of Japan that ranges across western Hokkaido between Wakkanai and Rumoi. Teuri and Yagishiri have a single road surrounding the island.

Ferry
The islands of Yagishiri and Teuri are served by ferry from the Port of Haboro.

Port of Haboro
The Port of Haboro was established in March 1953. It is administered by the town.

Schools

High schools
 Haboro Senior High School
 Teuri Senior High School

Junior high schools
 Haboro Junior High School
 Teuri Junior High School
 Yagishiri Junior High School

Elementary school 
 Haboro Elementary School
 Teuri Elementary School
 Yagishiri Elementary School

Mascot 

He is a fashionable common murre. He contributes to the town by promoting sightseeing and certain events. He eats sand eels. As an auk, he is a skilled swimmer. He owns a hat collection (of which his most favourite is his shrimp toque). Children often mistake him for a penguin.

References

External links

Official Website 

Towns in Hokkaido